Self Immolation is a record label and publishing company run by J. G. Thirlwell.  Originally an actual label for Thirlwell's self-released early Foetus EPs and albums, Self Immolation became more akin to a vanity label for Thirlwell's releases on Some Bizzare Records and Wax Trax! Records.  Most Self Immolation releases are identified by a call number beginning with a Foetal-inspired "WOMB" designator.

Beginning in the early 1990s, Thirlwell began a second personal label, Ectopic Entertainment (often shortened to Ectopic Ents).  Its exact relation to Self Immolation is unclear: initially called a "subsidiary" of Self Immolation, it appears to have later wholly replaced Self Immolation.  Coming full circle, Thirlwell's self-released Manorexia project is released on Ectopic Ents.

Self Immolation releases
WOMB S201 : Foetus Under Glass – Spite Your Face/OKFM
WOMB ALL 007 : You've Got Foetus On Your Breath – Wash It All Off
WOMB OYBL 1 : You've Got Foetus On Your Breath – Deaf
WOMB KX07 : Phillip And His Foetus Vibrations – Tell Me, What Is the Bane of Your Life
WOMB WSUSC 12.5 : Foetus Over Frisco – Custom Built for Capitalism
WOMB OYBL 2 : You've Got Foetus On Your Breath – Ache
WOMB FDL 3 : Scraping Foetus Off The Wheel – Hole
WOMB FAT 11.12 : Foetus Art Terrorism – Calamity Crush
WOMB FGH 12.8 : You've Got Foetus On Your Breath – Wash/Slog
WOMB UNC 7.12 : Foetus Über Frisco – Finely Honed Machine
FOE 1 : The Foetus of Excellence – The Foetus Of Excellence
WOMB FIP 4 : Scraping Foetus Off The Wheel – Nail
WOMB FAN 13 : The Foetus All-Nude Revue – Bedrock
WOMB PIG 12.12 : Scraping Foetus Off The Wheel – Ramrod
WOMB FIP 5 : Foetus Interruptus – Thaw
RIFLE 1 : Foetus Corruptus – Rife
WOMB INC 6 : Foetus Inc – Sink
WOMB FLY 18T : Foetus Inc – Butterfly Potion
WOMB FLEX 1 : Foetus Inc – Somnambulumdrum

Non-Existent releases
WOMB 6T33 : Foetus On The Beach.  Often mentioned in press releases, this triple-LP set was never issued.

Ectopic Ents releases
ECT ENTS 001 : ???
ECT ENTS 002 : Steroid Maximus – Quilombo
ECT ENTS 003 : Steroid Maximus – Gondwanaland
ECT ENTS 004 : ???
ECT ENTS 005 : Foetus In Excelsis Corruptus Deluxe – Male
ECT ENTS 006 : ???
ECT ENTS 007 : ???
ECT ENTS 008 : Foetus - Gash
ECT ENTS 009 : Foetus – Null disc of Null/Void
ECT ENTS 010 : Foetus – Void disc of Null/Void
ECT ENTS 011 : ???
ECT ENTS 012 : You've Got Foetus On Your Breath – Deaf reissue (Thirsty Ear CD)
ECT ENTS 013 : You've Got Foetus On Your Breath – Ache reissue (Thirsty Ear CD)
ECT ENTS 014 : ???
ECT ENTS 015 : ???
ECT ENTS 016 : ???
ECT ENTS 017 : ???
ECT ENTS 018 : ???
ECT ENTS 019 : ???
ECT ENTS 020 : Foetus - Flow
ECT ENTS 021 : Manorexia – Volvox Turbo
ECT ENTS 022 : Foetus - Blow
ECT ENTS 023 : Steroid Maximus – Ectopia
ECT ENTS 024 : Manorexia – The Radiolarian Ooze
ECT ENTS 025 : ???
ECT ENTS 026 : Foetus – (not adam)
ECT ENTS 027 : Foetus – Love
ECT ENTS 028 : Foetus – Damp
ECT ENTS 029 : Foetus – Vein
ECT ENTS 030 : Foetus – Limb
ECT ENTS 031 : The Venture Bros.: The Music of JG Thirlwell (released by Williams Street Records, designation used for sale at Ectopic's online shop)
ECT ENTS 032 : v/a – Bait (Other Music Digital exclusive compilation featuring previously released Foetus, Steroid Maximus, and Manorexia tracks)

See also
 List of record labels

References

Industrial record labels
Australian independent record labels